Didiplis is a monotypic genus of flowering plants belonging to the family Lythraceae. The only species is Didiplis diandra.

Its native range is Southeastern USA to Northeastern Mexico.

References

Lythraceae
Lythraceae genera
Monotypic Myrtales genera